The 1964 U.S. Figure Skating Championships was held at the Cleveland Arena in Cleveland, Ohio from January 10–12, 1964. Medals were awarded in three colors: gold (first), silver (second), and bronze (third) in four disciplines – men's singles, ladies singles, pair skating, and ice dancing – across three levels: senior, junior, and novice.

The event determined the U.S. team for the 1964 Olympic Games and 1964 World Championships.

Senior results

Men
Scott Allen defeated defending champion Thomas Litz, winning both the compulsory figures and free skating.

Ladies
Peggy Fleming was the surprise champion. She had placed third in the compulsory figures. Fleming skated a spectacular free skating with a succession of double jumps with flow and ease, completing her program with a flawless fast spin.

Pairs
Siblings Judianne Fotheringill / Jerry Fotheringill retained their title, and Vivian / Ronald Joseph retained their silver medals.

Ice dancing (Gold dance)
Darlene Streich / Charles Fetter were the new champions.

Junior results

Men

Ladies

Pairs

Ice dancing (Silver dance)

Novice results

References

U.S. Figure Skating Championships
United States Figure Skating Championships, 1964
United States Figure Skating Championships, 1964
January 1964 sports events in the United States